General elections were held in East Germany on 15 October 1950. They were the first held since the founding of the country on 7 October 1949. There were 466 deputies in the Volkskammer, including 66 from East Berlin who were not directly elected. 

This election set the tone for all elections held in East Germany until the Peaceful Revolution. Voters were presented with a single list from the National Front of Democratic Germany, which in turn was controlled by the Socialist Unity Party.  Only one candidate appeared on the ballot; voters simply took the ballot paper and dropped it into the ballot box.  Those who wanted to vote against the candidate had to go to a special booth, without any secrecy.  Seats were apportioned based on a set quota, not actual vote totals.  By ensuring that its candidates dominated the list, the SED effectively predetermined the composition of the Volkskammer.

According to official figures, the National Front list received the approval of 99.6% of voters, with turnout reported to be 98.5%.

Results

References

1950 in East Germany
Elections in East Germany
East Germany
1950 elections in Germany
October 1950 events in Europe